The 1930 Marshall Thundering Herd football team was an American football team that represented Marshall College (now Marshall University) in the West Virginia Athletic Conference during the 1930 college football season. In its second season under head coach John Maulbetsch, the team compiled a 3–5–1 record, 3–0–1 against conference opponents, and was outscored by a total of 130 to 111. Tom Stark was the team captain.

Schedule

References

Marshall
Marshall Thundering Herd football seasons
Marshall Thundering Herd football